is a railway station in Ōita City, Ōita Prefecture, Japan. It is operated by JR Kyushu and is on the Nippō Main Line. The station serves Ōzai, a village that has now been merged into Ōita City and is typically busy with commuter traffic. It is also the nearest station to the Nippon Bunri University located at the nearby Ōita suburb of Sakanoichi.

Lines

Layout 
The station consists of a side and an island platform serving three tracks at grade. The station building is a modern concrete structure with a distinctive saw-tooth roof. It houses a waiting area, SUGOCA card readers and a staffed ticket window. Access to the island platform is by means of a footbridge. Bike sheds and parking are available at the station forecourt. Next to the station building is another footbridge which links the streets on both sides of the tracks.
 
Management of the passenger facilities at the station has been outsourced to the JR Kyushu Tetsudou Eigyou Co., a wholly owned subsidiary of JR Kyushu specialising in station services. It staffs the ticket window which is equipped with a Midori no Madoguchi facility.

Platforms
The station consist of 3 platforms:
Platform 1
Used by pass through Trains: Nichirin
 Used for trains in the direction of Saiki.
Platform 2
Used for trains in the direction of Ōita.
Platform 3
Used as a stop for freight trains, special trains and first departures (Ōita-bound).

Adjacent stations

History
Japanese Government Railways (JGR) opened the station on 25 November 1924 as an additional station on the existing track of its Nippō Main Line. With the privatization of Japanese National Railways (JNR), the successor of JGR, on 1 April 1987, the station came under the control of JR Kyushu.

JR Kyushu had planned to convert Ōzai (with several other stations in Ōita City) into an unstaffed, remotely-managed "Smart Support Station" by 17 March 2018. After opposition from users, this move was postponed, pending works to improve accessibility.

Passenger statistics
In fiscal 2016, the station was used by an average of 2,061 passengers daily (boarding passengers only), and it ranked 89th among the busiest stations of JR Kyushu.

Surrounding area
Nippon Bunri University

See also
List of railway stations in Japan

References

External links 

Ōzai (JR Kyushu)

Railway stations in Ōita Prefecture
Railway stations in Japan opened in 1924
Ōita (city)